The SS Portugal was a steam ship originally built by a French shipping company, but requisitioned for use as a Russian hospital ship during the First World War. On  she was sunk by a torpedo from the German U-boat .

History
She was originally built in 1886 for the Brazil and River Plate Line of the Messageries Maritimes Company.  She was chartered or purchased by the Russians for use as a hospital ship in the Black Sea. The ship, serviced to take up wounded soldiers along the sea shore Ardeshen, Rize Port, Fakhtia, Tiribon and Of, the ship could have the chance to make only 5 voyages, beginning on 27 February, 1916.

Sinking

, 1916, Portugal was towing a string of small flat-bottomed boats to ferry wounded from the shore to the ship. Off Rizeh, on the Turkish coast of the Black Sea, she had stopped as one of the small boats was sinking and repairs were being made. The ship was not carrying wounded at the time, but had a staff of Red Cross physicians and nurses on board, as well as her usual crew.

The ship's crew saw a periscope approaching the vessel but as the ship was a hospital ship and protected by the Hague conventions no evasive actions were taken. Without warning the submarine fired a torpedo which missed. The U-boat, U-33, came around again fired a torpedo from a distance of 30 feet, which hit near the engine room, breaking the ship into two pieces.

Vperiod
On , another Russian hospital ship, named Vperiod (Вперёд; also transcribed, French-style, as  Vperiode) was sunk between Rizeh and Batum, allegedly by German U-boat . The boat was not carrying wounded, as she was on her trip to the frontline. Seven people died, the rest were saved.

The Russian government claimed that Turkish forces sank  Portugal, and Vperiod.  The Turkish government replied that both ships were sunk by mines.

See also
 List of hospital ships sunk in World War I
 List of Russian Fleet hospital ships

References

External links

Le paquebot PORTUGAL des Messageries Maritimes 

World War I shipwrecks in the Black Sea
Maritime incidents in 1916
Hospital ships in World War I
1886 ships
Ships built in France
Ships sunk by German submarines in World War I
World War I naval ships of Russia
Hospital ships of the Soviet Union and Russia
World War I crimes by Imperial Germany